Gale Katchur is a Canadian politician and current mayor of Fort Saskatchewan, Alberta.

Biography
Katchur was born Gale Lewchuk in Fort St. John, British Columbia, but raised on a farm near Spirit River, Alberta.

Katchur served as a civil servant in the Alberta government before moving to private industry with Baker International. A few years after the birth of her second child in 1983, Katchur was hired as a civil servant for the City of Fort Saskatchewan where she worked for 17 years.

Katchur was first elected to political office in 2007 as a Fort Saskatchewan city councillor, officially resigning her job within the city government upon her election.

In 2010, she defeated incumbent mayor Jim Sheasgreen by earning 54.8% of the popular vote in the two-candidate mayoral race.  She was reelected in 2013, 2017 and 2021. 

Katchur is the second female mayor in the history of Fort Saskatchewan. Muriel Abdurahman was the first.

Personal life
Katchur is married to husband Wayne, a retired banker. They have two children: Ryan and Erin. Both are married and have children. Ryan has 2 kids named Rune and Kaia, and Erin has 2 kids named Logan and Arianna.

References

External links
 http://www.fortsask.ca/city-government/city-council
 http://www.electkatchur.ca/

Living people
Mayors of Fort Saskatchewan
Women mayors of places in Alberta
People from Fort St. John, British Columbia
Year of birth missing (living people)
21st-century Canadian politicians